Barış Odabaş (born 21 February 1991) is a German-Turkish footballer who plays as a defender for DJK Bad Homburg.

References

External links
 Profile at FuPa.net

1991 births
Living people
Footballers from Frankfurt
German footballers
Turkish footballers
Association football defenders
SV Viktoria Preußen 07 players
Eintracht Frankfurt players
SV Darmstadt 98 players
Kickers Offenbach players
Boluspor footballers
3. Liga players
Regionalliga players
TFF First League players
FSV Optik Rathenow players